Daniel Thomas Gray (born January 29, 1956) is a former American football defensive tackle. He played in the National Football League (NFL) for the Detroit Lions in 1978.

Born in Phillipsburg, New Jersey and raised in nearby Belvidere, New Jersey, Gray played prep football at Belvidere High School.

References

1956 births
Living people
American football defensive tackles
Rutgers Scarlet Knights football players
Detroit Lions players
People from Belvidere, New Jersey
People from Phillipsburg, New Jersey
Players of American football from New Jersey
Sportspeople from Warren County, New Jersey